Emmanuel Karagiannis (born 22 November 1966) is a Belgian former professional footballer who played as a midfielder. He made eight appearances for the Belgium national team from 1995 to 1998.

References

External links
 

1966 births
Living people
Belgian footballers
Association football midfielders
Belgium international footballers
Belgium youth international footballers
Belgium under-21 international footballers
Belgian Pro League players
K. Patro Eisden Maasmechelen players
K.S.V. Waregem players
R.F.C. Seraing (1904) players
Royal Antwerp F.C. players
R.A.A. Louviéroise players
Beerschot A.C. players